Fr. Marcelline Jayakody (Sinhala: මර්සලින් ජයකොඩි පියතුමා) (3 June 1902 ─ January 15, 1998) was a Sri Lankan Catholic priest, musician, lyricist, author, journalist and an exponent of indigenous culture.  He is attributed with the epithet 'පන්සලේ පියතුමා' (Pansale Piyathuma - Priest in the Temple). Ven. Dr. Ittapane Dhammalankara Thera authored a book on Jayakody's life, මල් පැලේ උපන් පන්සලේ පියතුමා, (Malpale Upan Pansale Piyathuma), which is recorded as the first book in the world by a Buddhist prelate on a Catholic priest.

Passion Play of Duwa 
Fr. Jayakody served as the head priest in Duwa in 1939. Duwa is the Passion Play Village of Sri Lanka. Originally, the play used traditional puppets as actors. Jayakody wrote the original script for a passion play, influenced by Fr. Jacome Gonsalves, and composed new hymns to the traditional "Pasan". He next introduced live male and female actors instead of puppets. Eventually there were over 250 live actors taking the place of puppets in his adaptation of Dorothy L. Sayers's The Man Born to Be King (Dukprathi Prasangaya in Sinhala). The Duwa passion play was considered as the greatest passion show in Asia at that time.

Awards 
 In 1979 his poetry book Muthu (Pearls) won the National State Literary Award (the first Catholic priest to have won a state award).
 In 1982 he was honoured with the title "Kalasuri" by the state, and "Kithu Nandana Pranamaya" by the Catholic Church for his contributions to arts and culture for over six decades.
 In 1983 he won the Ramon Magsaysay Award, considered the Asian Nobel Prize, (along with $US20,000, a medal and a citation) in Manila, Philippines in the category of Journalism, Literature, and the Creative Communication Arts (JLCCA) as appeared on the List of Ramon Magsaysay Award winners.

Footnotes

References 

 "'Christmas, a season of goodwill and celebrations'". sundayobserver.lk. 2005.. Retrieved 2005-12-25.
 "'Pansale Piyathuma'- 103 years old". sundaytimes. 2005.. Retrieved /2005/08/21.
 "'Pansale Piyatuma' at the age of 95". sundaytimes. 1997.. Retrieved /19977/06/01.
 "A legend in his own lifetime". sundayobserver. 2004.. Retrieved /2004/05/23.
 "A singer – with style". sundayobserver. 2007.. Retrieved /2007/06/03.
 "Birth centenary of Fr. Marcelline Jayakody". passionplay.lankasites.  Retrieved 14 March 2009.
 "Carols and their impact on Sri Lanka". Sunday Observer.2004.. Retrieved /2004/12/19.
 "Christmas Carols in Sri Lanka". dailynews. 2007.. Retrieved /2007/12/25.
 "CITATION for Marcelline Jayakody". rmaf.org..
 "Could Fr. Marcelline Jayakody be called 'Modern Fr. Jacome Gonsalvez'?". island.. 2001.. Retrieved /2001/01/08.
 "D. F. Kariyakarawana 60 'Not Out' in journalism". island. 2006.. Retrieved 2006/05/14.
 "Fifty Years after Rekava...: Rekava – The Line of Density (1956)". sundayobserver.lk. 2006. .
 "Glimpses of genuine socialism". Sunday observer. 2006.. Retrieved /2006/12/03.
 "Inspiring life sketch of Fr. Mercelline Jayakody". dailynews. 2007.. Retrieved /2007/09/05.
 "Latha Icon & national treasure". dailynews. 2008.. Retrieved /2008/11/4.
 "Pahan Ridma': Choral music on CD". sundaytimer.. 2007.. Retrieved /2007/06/24.
 "Sunil Santha songs – something to treasure". Sundaytimes. 2008.  Retrieved 2009/11/1.
 "The Father in the temple". dailymirror. 2010.. Retrieved /2010/02/01.
 "True propagator of Dhamma". dailynews. 2010.. Retrieved /2010/10/14.
 "Two eminent Sri Lankans in the field of arts were born in the first week of June.". sundaytimes. 2007. . Retrieved /2007/06/03.

External links 

 
 Malpale Upan Pansale Piyatuma
 The 1983 Ramon Magsaysay Award for Journalism, Literature and Creative Communication Arts CITATION for Marcelline Jayakody

1902 births
1998 deaths
Hela Havula
Ramon Magsaysay Award winners
Sri Lankan lyricists
Sri Lankan poets
Sri Lankan songwriters
20th-century Sri Lankan Roman Catholic priests
Sinhalese writers
Sinhalese priests